Governor Anthony may refer to:

George T. Anthony (1824–1896), 7th Governor of Kansas
Henry B. Anthony (1815–1884), 21st Governor of Rhode Island